The Graves Light is a lighthouse located on The Graves, the outermost island of the Boston Harbor Islands National Recreation Area, and  offshore of downtown Boston, Massachusetts, USA.

At , it is the tallest lighthouse in the approaches to the Port of Boston, and is an important navigation aid for traffic to and from the port. It was built at the same time that the North Channel into Boston Harbor was dredged to become the principal entrance for large vessels. The Graves are the outermost rocks near the outer end of the North Channel.

It was added to the National Register of Historic Places as Graves Light Station on September 28, 1987, reference number 87002041.

Construction and history
The lighthouse was  built in 1905, to a conical design using granite blocks on a granite foundation, and equipped with one of the few first-order Fresnel lens used. The lens assembly stands about 12 ft (4m) tall and is now at the Smithsonian Institution. The light was the setting for the climactic storm in the 1948 film Portrait of Jennie.

Operated by the United States Coast Guard, the light was automated in 1976 and has a characteristic of two white flashes every 12 seconds.

Various sources agree that the ledges were named for a Thomas Graves, but differ on who he was; some prefer a 17th-century English rear admiral; others like a colonial-era American merchant. The USCG history web site shows both. The new owners retained a historian who ascertained that the ledges were named for Rear Admiral Thomas Graves (1605–1653), whose family settled in Charlestown, Massachusetts, but who died in an English naval battle against the Dutch in 1653.

The Graves Island Light Station was put up for auction on June 10, 2013, by the U.S. General Services Administration.  Opening bid was $26,000. The tenth and winning bid was a record $933,888, the highest price ever paid for a U.S. lighthouse. A Massachusetts couple, David and Lynn Waller, were the buyers of the lighthouse. The lighthouse includes two bedrooms, a kitchen, and a study, but landing is difficult and entering the building requires traversing a  ladder. A former caretaker described it like "living in a pipe."

, the Wallers were undertaking a major restoration project costing hundreds of thousands of dollars.  The lighthouse is still being used for navigation using solar panels since 2001, and will remain so under the terms of the sale.  These replaced a severed underwater cable that supplied electricity from the town of Hull. The cable had replaced the original oil-fired lamp, fueled with oil stored in an adjacent building; the walkway to the oil house washed away in 1991.

See also
National Register of Historic Places listings in southern Boston, Massachusetts

References

External links
 
 Graves Island Light Station Auction
 Graves Light Station official homepage
 Boston Globe Photos 
 Boston Globe profile and video tour

Lighthouses completed in 1903
1903 establishments in Massachusetts
Boston Harbor
Lighthouses on the National Register of Historic Places in Massachusetts
Lighthouses in Boston
National Register of Historic Places in Boston